Hugh Johnston Ryden (born 7 April 1943) is a Scottish footballer, who played as an inside forward in the Football League for Bristol Rovers, Stockport County, Chester and Halifax Town. when playing for Chester in season 1964-65 under manager Peter Hauser, Hughie, as he was known, was part of the forward line that scored over 100 league goals and was a member of the team that narrowly lost to Manchester United (featuring Best, Law and Charlton, plus a future Chester player, Ian Moir) in the FA cup at Old Trafford.

References

1943 births
Living people
Sportspeople from Dumbarton
Footballers from West Dunbartonshire
Association football inside forwards
Scottish footballers
Yoker Athletic F.C. players
Leeds United F.C. players
Bristol Rovers F.C. players
Stockport County F.C. players
Chester City F.C. players
Halifax Town A.F.C. players
Great Harwood Town F.C. players